"Hot for Teacher" is a song by the American rock band Van Halen, taken from their sixth studio album, 1984. The song was written by band members Eddie Van Halen, Alex Van Halen, Michael Anthony and David Lee Roth, and produced by Ted Templeman. It was released as the fourth and final single from the album in October 1984, and was the final single released during the band's 1974–1985 era.

The song features Alex Van Halen's double bass drum performance, and its music video, featuring the band as both adults and young students. Unusually for a single, it begins with a 30-second drum solo, followed by another 30 seconds of instrumental introduction. The ending of this song comes from a studio demo from the band's club days, entitled "Voodoo Queen".

Musical style
The song is a mixture of glam metal, heavy metal, hard rock, and speed metal.

Music video

The music video (directed by Pete Angelus and David Lee Roth, and produced by Jerry Kramer and Glenn Goodwin, choreographed by Vincent Paterson with concept/treatment by Anthony Nasch) was filmed at John Marshall High School, with Phil Hartman performing the voice of Waldo, the video's protagonist. Waldo, an awkward boy with large glasses and a bow tie, is put on the school bus by his over-protective mother. He is terrified by the unruly kids on the bus; the driver played by Roth, tells him "si'down, Waldo!" as the opening drums begin. Along with Waldo, the "kid versions" of Van Halen face the trials and tribulations of grade school. Two models appear as teachers in the video, Donna Rupert (1981 Miss Canada pageant runner up), who plays the chemistry teacher, and Lillian Müller, who plays the Phys Ed teacher. Both teachers tear off their dresses to reveal a bikini, to the cheers of the students. At the end of the video, the kids are shown to have grown up to become a gynecologist (Alex Van Halen), a sumo wrestler (Michael Anthony), a psychiatric hospital patient (Eddie Van Halen), and a game show host (Roth). While it is said that no one was sure what Waldo grew up to be, the video hints at him becoming a pimp, the total opposite of his child self. This is intercut with scenes with the band members dressed in red suits and dancing to the song under a disco ball.

An initial controversy arose when the video showed all the band members performing a quick crotch-grab during the "...so bad..." part of the chorus; at first, the 1980s NBC late-night show Friday Night Videos added black-box censor bars to the crotch-grabs but eventually relented and removed the black-box from their video.

Reception
Cash Box said that the song "shows [Van Halen] at their absolute zenith," saying that "multi-watt voltage surges through this speeding hard rock anthem, with Eddie Van Halen again proving why he is the best."

In 2009 it was named the 36th best hard rock song of all time by VH1. Chuck Klosterman of Vulture.com ranked it the sixth-best Van Halen song, calling it "the encapsulation of almost everything Van Halen is known for, all within the space of five minutes: Athletic drumming, an extended guitar introduction that transitions into a thick principal riff, vocals that are spoken more than sung, two interlocked solos, and lyrics that are technically demeaning but somehow come across as non-toxic and guileless."

Personnel

David Lee Roth – lead vocals
Eddie Van Halen – lead and rhythm guitar, backing vocals
Alex Van Halen – drums
Michael Anthony – bass guitar, backing vocals

Charts

References

Further reading

External links
 "Hot For Teacher" Anniversary & Fun Facts! on Van Halen News Desk 

Van Halen songs
1984 songs
1984 singles
Songs written by Eddie Van Halen
Songs written by Alex Van Halen
Songs written by Michael Anthony (musician)
Songs written by David Lee Roth
Song recordings produced by Ted Templeman
Songs about school
Songs about educators
Warner Music Group singles
Warner Records singles
Speed metal songs